John Pulskamp (born April 19, 2001) is an American professional soccer player who plays as a goalkeeper for Major League Soccer club Sporting Kansas City.

Club career
Born in Bakersfield, California, Pulskamp began his career with U.S. Soccer Development Academy sides Central California Aztecs and Real So Cal, before joining the youth academy at LA Galaxy. On June 23, 2018, Pulskamp made an appearance on the bench for LA Galaxy II, the club's reserve side in the USL Championship, but did not come on as a substitute.

On April 5, 2019, Pulskamp signed with Sporting Kansas City II, the reserve side of Major League Soccer club Sporting Kansas City. He made his debut for the side on May 6 against Louisville City, starting in a 3–2 victory. Pulskamp ended his first professional season helping his side keep three clean sheets from 14 matches.

Sporting Kansas City
On February 24, 2020, Pulskamp signed a professional homegrown player deal with Major League Soccer club Sporting Kansas City. He spent the majority of the 2020 season as a backup goalkeeper, appearing on the bench 13 times but without making a single appearance. He also made two appearances for Sporting Kansas City II in the USL Championship, with loans being limited due to the COVID-19 pandemic.

Pulskamp made his debut for Sporting on April 17, 2021, during the club's first match of the season against the New York Red Bulls. Due to injuries to Sporting Kansas City starting goalkeeper Tim Melia and two backups, Pulskamp given the start. The match ended in a 2–1 victory.

International career
On January 18, 2020, Pulskamp made his international debut for the United States under-20 side against Mexico U20. In December 2021, he was called up to the senior team for their friendly against Bosnia and Herzegovina, but did not make an appearance in the match.

Career statistics

Club

References

External links
 Profile at Sporting Kansas City

2001 births
Living people
Sportspeople from Bakersfield, California
Soccer players from California
American people of Palestinian descent
American soccer players
Association football goalkeepers
Sporting Kansas City II players
Sporting Kansas City players
USL Championship players
Major League Soccer players
MLS Next Pro players
Homegrown Players (MLS)
United States men's youth international soccer players